Lake of the Woods 35J is a First Nations reserve in Kenora District, Ontario. It consists of Comegan Island, Sanguishii-aagaamiing Island and Sanguishii-aagaamiising Island in Lake of the Woods, and is one of the reserves of the Big Grassy First Nation.

References

External links
 Canada Lands Survey System

Saulteaux reserves in Ontario
Communities in Kenora District